The 2014 Princeton Tigers football team represented Princeton University in the 2014 NCAA Division I FCS football season. They were led by fifth-year head coach Bob Surace and played their home games at Powers Field at Princeton Stadium. Princeton were a member of the Ivy League. They finished the season 5–5 overall and 4–3 in Ivy League play to place fourth. Princeton averaged 9,865 fans per game.

Schedule

References

Princeton
Princeton Tigers football seasons
Princeton Tigers football